Peterson Bluff is a prominent bluff (1,480 m) on the north side of Ebbe Glacier. The feature forms the southeast end of the broad ridge descending from Mount Bolt in the Anare Mountains. Mapped by United States Geological Survey (USGS) from surveys and U.S. Navy aerial photography, 1960–63. Named by Advisory Committee on Antarctic Names (US-ACAN) for Donald C. Peterson, photographer's mate with U.S. Navy Squadron VX-6 at McMurdo Station, 1967–68 and 1968–69.

Cliffs of Victoria Land
Pennell Coast